The 1973–74 season was Kilmarnock’s 72nd in Scottish League Competitions. They finished as runners-up in the Scottish Second Division and were promoted back to the First Division after 1 season in the 2nd tier.

Scottish Second Division

Scottish League Cup

Group stage

Group 5 final table

Knockout stage

Scottish Cup

See also
List of Kilmarnock F.C. seasons

References

External links
https://www.fitbastats.com/kilmarnock/team_results_season.php

Kilmarnock F.C. seasons